Evgueni Chtchetinine or Yaŭgen Shchatsinin (born 1 February 1970) is a professional table tennis player from Minsk, Belarus. In 2003, he won the European Championship in men's double and team categories. He also competed at the 1996 Summer Olympics and the 2000 Summer Olympics.

References 

1970 births
Living people
Belarusian male table tennis players
Table tennis players at the 2015 European Games
European Games competitors for Belarus
Olympic table tennis players of Belarus
Table tennis players at the 1996 Summer Olympics
Table tennis players at the 2000 Summer Olympics